is a 1981 comedy film, adapted from Tony Kenrick's novel Two for the Price of One; Kenrick wrote the screenplay for this film.

Plot
Three therapy patients — Dibley (Gabe Kaplan), whose memory often fails him; Swaboda (Alex Karras), who believes that his late mother is still alive and living with him; and Walter (Robert Klein), who has three personalities — want the city to buy them a new car after theirs is totaled by a pothole. Legal means prove to be insufficient, so the three of them hatch a plan to extort the money from the mayor (Arthur Rosenberg).

Cast
 Gabe Kaplan as Dibley
 Alex Karras as Swaboda
 Robert Klein as Walter
 Susan Clark as Carol
 Paul Stewart as Dr. Segal
 James Cromwell as Dr. Carson
 Peter Bonerz as Randall Kendall
 John DiSanti as "Knuckles"
 Alex Rocco as The Boss
 Arthur Rosenberg as The Mayor
 Alden McKay as Mr. Freeman 
 Roz Simmons as Mrs. Freeman
 Barbara Wherry as Miss West
 Al Kiggins as Colonel Brogan
 Harold Bergman as Captain
 Ken Rahger as Corporal
 Julio Mechoso as Gang Member 
 Jose Fong as Gang Member
 Jorge Gil as Gang Member

External links
 
 
 

1981 films
1981 directorial debut films
1981 comedy films
American comedy films
Columbia Pictures films
Films about dissociative identity disorder
1980s English-language films
Films about amnesia
Films directed by Peter Bonerz
Films set in Miami
Films shot in Miami
1980s American films